Frank Foster (born January 22, 1982 in Cypress Bottom, Claiborne Parish, Louisiana, United States) is an American country music singer-songwriter. Foster has released Eight independent albums: Rowdy Reputation in 2011, Red Wings and Six Strings in 2012, Southern Soul in 2013, Rhythm and Whiskey in 2014, “Boots on the Ground” in 2016, “Good Country Music” in 2016, 2018 “Till I’m Gone” and in 2020 “The Way It Was”

Jonathan Widran of AllMusic gave Red Wings and Six Strings four stars out of five, writing that "Foster's ability to connect lies in the raw emotional authenticity of his storytelling." Southern Soul sold 6,000 copies in its first week of release, debuting at number 11 on the Billboard Top Country Albums chart and number 67 on the Billboard 200.  Rhythm and Whiskey debuted at No. 21 on the Billboard 200 and No. 4 on the Hot Country Albums chart, with 9,000 copies sold in the US the first week.

Discography

Albums

Singles

Music videos

References

External links

American country singer-songwriters
American male singer-songwriters
Country musicians from Louisiana
1982 births
Living people
Singer-songwriters from Louisiana